Tsidiiyazhi abini is an extinct relative of the modern mousebirds, found in 2017 in the Nacimiento Formation on ancestral Navajo lands in New Mexico. It is the only species in the genus Tsidiiyazhi. It lived between 62.2 and 62.5 million years ago, making it one of the oldest Cenozoic birds yet described.

References

Coliiformes
Danian genera
Paleocene birds
Prehistoric bird genera